Automated Truck Loading Systems - ATLS has been commonly used in the material handling industry to refer to the automation of loading or unloading trucks and trailers with product either on or without pallets, slip sheets, racks, containers, using several different types of automated guided vehicle systems (AGV) or engineered conveyor belt systems that are integrated into vehicles, automating the shipping / receiving and logistics operations.

These conveyor systems are commonly referred to as

Roller beds
Slip chains
T-Bars
Live Floors
Roller Tracks
Belt Floors
Trailer Skates
Skate & Tracks
Slat Floors
Chain Floors
Cable Floors
Powered Cargo Rollers

Some of these systems are used to handle bulk products such as garbage, agriculture products, recycled tires, cotton, bark or sawdust. Manufacturing industries such as automotive, food & beverage, paper, consumer products, appliance manufacturers and uses ATLS systems for incoming materials and outgoing product to increase throughput and streamline production. The transportation industry relies heavily on ATLS material handling systems to rapidly move product via land, sea, and air.

The major advantages of ATLS are:

 Increased trailer loading capacity with 200% to 300% (no wheeled containers needed)
 Trailer unloading time reduced, which results in better trailer utilization
 Reduced manpower
 Increased ergonomics for workforce
 Fewer docks needed (due to higher trailer loading capacity)
 Maximizing sorting machines utilization
 No forklifts needed, which means safer working environment

ATLS vehicle loading technologies significantly reduce the manpower required on the shipping and receiving docks, eliminate product damage, accidents, and ergonomic injuries related to lift-truck operation. Generally, products can be loaded quicker and product density is increased resulting in more payload per shipment which reduces shipping cost, using a loading automation system. Loading automation is often the key component to achieve complete plant automation.

See also
Material handling equipment

References

Vehicle technology